"On the Street Where You Live" is a song from the 1956 Broadway musical My Fair Lady. 

On the Street Where You Live may also refer to:
 On the Street Where You Live (TV series), an Irish documentary television series
 On The Street Where You Live, a 2001 novel by Mary Higgins Clark